Overton Gymnasium is a historic gymnasium in Overton, Nevada. It was listed on the National Register of Historic Places in 1992.

The gymnasium was designed in the Italian Renaissance Revival style by Miles E. Miller in 1938-39 under the Public Works Administration program.

References 

Buildings and structures in Overton, Nevada
National Register of Historic Places in Clark County, Nevada
Italian Renaissance Revival architecture in the United States
Nevada State Register of Historic Places
New Deal in Nevada
School buildings on the National Register of Historic Places in Nevada